Patrick Roche was a member of the Wisconsin State Assembly during the 1877 session. A Democrat, he represented the 4th District of Dodge County, Wisconsin. He was born on January 21, 1821, in County Wexford, Ireland.

References

Politicians from County Wexford
Irish emigrants to the United States (before 1923)
People from Dodge County, Wisconsin
1821 births
Year of death missing
Democratic Party members of the Wisconsin State Assembly